Michael Meyersfeld is a fine art photographer living and working in Johannesburg, South Africa. Meyersfeld works with both fine art and advertising photography.

Life and work

Born to a South African mother and French-German father, Meyersfeld's interest in photography began at a very early age when he made his first contact prints from a Baby Brownie camera at his family home in Johannesburg. He was schooled at King Edward Vll, and attained a B.Com. in 1961, from the University of the Witwatersrand, after which he joined the family steel merchandising business.

At 47, he left the family business and for the next twenty years worked as an advertising photographer, all the while exhibiting his fine art work. Most of Meyersfeld's photographs require a level of ‘staging'. As examples, Life Staged, a series consisting of four bodies of work, 12 Naked Men (2007), Woman Undone, Guests at the Troyeville Hotel and Urban Disquiet. Gradually the representational has made way for pictures that happen without planning.

Awards
 2009 - 1 Gold Award - Professional Advertising Category (Yum Yum Purple)
 2010 - Gold Non-Commissioned Body Single (Alex Church), London AOP Awards, London

Exhibitions
 2012: Retrospective: ABSA Gallery
 2011: Transience: In Toto Gallery
 2007: David Brown Gallery

Publications
Gaze. 
Life Staged. . Accompanied the exhibition of the same title.

References

Living people
South African photographers
Fine art photographers
1940 births